William Adams Kimbrough (born May 1, 1964) is an American singer-songwriter, multi-instrumentalist and producer based in Nashville, Tennessee.

Biography
Kimbrough was born in Mobile, Alabama, and started his musical career as a founding member of Will & the Bushmen, a popular college band in the eighties that produced a handful of albums and singles and made it to MTV. He then went on to form the Bis-Quits with long-time friend Tommy Meyer. The Bis-quits produced an eponymous album which was released on John Prine’s Oh Boy Records label.

Kimbrough is also a producer and has produced albums for Adrienne Young, Rodney Crowell, Todd Snider, Kate Campbell, Steve Poltz, Kim Richey, Garrison Starr, Matthew Ryan, and Josh Rouse.

His songs have been recorded by Jimmy Buffett, Little Feat, Jack Ingram, Todd Snider and more. Kimbrough has also collaborated with many artists including Rosanne Cash, Guy Clark, Rodney Crowell, Steve Earle, Gomez, Emmylou Harris, The Jayhawks, Mark Knopfler, Buddy Miller, John Prine, Toumani Diabate, Kim Richey, Josh Rouse, Matthew Ryan, Billy Joe Shaver, Todd Snider, Mavis Staples, Garrison Starr, Adrienne Young, and others.

Kimbrough was recognized in 2004 as the Instrumentalist of the Year by the Americana Music Association – an award that had previously been awarded three years in a row to Dobro ace Jerry Douglas. His songs demonstrate a literate facility that he pairs with guitar playing so fluid that his fans created a t-shirt suggesting he's an alien.

Kimbrough teamed up with Tommy Womack, John Deaderick, Paul Griffith and Dave Jacques in 2005 to create the five piece band, Daddy.  They recorded a live album in Frankfort, Kentucky Daddy at the Women's Club and later an album called For a Second Time.

In 2007, Kimbrough released EP – his solo studio recording that revealed a hint of what would develop on his next full-length release.

Kimbrough has released several solo albums to date, and has collaborated on many more, as well as serving as a session musician and sideman.
Kimbrough was one of the guest artists at Jimmy Buffett's Live from the Gulf Coast Concert on July 11, 2010.

In March 2012, it was announced that Kimbrough had joined Trigger Hippy in place of guitarist Audley Freed.

In frequent visits to visit his family, Kimbrough joined a number of other Southern Alabama singer-songwriters beginning in 2013 to form Willie Sugarcapps.

Influences
Born and raised on the Alabama Gulf Coast, Kimbrough ingested eclectic FM radio sounds and the music of nearby New Orleans as a young man. His sound has been influenced by traditions of folk, blues, gospel, country, punk rock and jazz.

Will Kimbrough described "When Your Lovin' Comes Around" from his 2014 release, Sideshow Love, as "a little bit of a tribute to JJ Cale," who he said was a significant influence on his music.

Social commentary
The songs on his album Americanitis, such as "Warring Ways" and "Everyone's in Love", have been described by Kimbrough as anti-war and anti-greed themed.

His album Wings explores themes surrounding the conflicts between family and career, love and work, parents and children. The music is based in folk rock, with touches of guitar, cello, saxophone, trumpet, banjo, and Hammond organ.

Discography

Solo albums
Fireworks, Vol. 2 (1999)
This (2000)
Home Away (2002)
Godsend (2003)
Americanitis (2006)
EP (2007)
Wings (2009)
Sideshow Love (2014)
I Like It Down Here (2019)

References

External links
Official Site
Daddy Band Site
Will Kimbrough collection at the Internet Archive's live music archive
Willie Sugarcapps site

American male singer-songwriters
American rock songwriters
Musicians from Mobile, Alabama
American rock singers
1964 births
Living people
Singer-songwriters from Alabama